The Roman Catholic Diocese of São Tomé and Príncipe  is a diocese, immediately subject to the Holy See, with its seat in the city of São Tomé in São Tomé and Príncipe. It covers the territory of the Republic of São Tomé and Príncipe. , 112,000 or 57.4% of the inhabitants of São Tomé and Príncipe were catholic.

History
The diocese was established on 3 November 1534 as the Diocese of Tomé from Metropolitan Archdiocese of Funchal in Portugal. The diocese initially included the Portuguese controlled or Christian areas of southwestern Africa. In 1596, it lost territory to the new diocese of São Salvador do Congo (today's Angola). in 1818 it lost territory to the new Apostolic Vicariate of Cape of Good Hope (today's South Africa). In 1842 it lost territory to the new Apostolic Prefecture of the Two Guineas and Senegambia (much of central and west Africa). In 1924, the diocese was renamed Diocese of São Tomé. In 1957 it was renamed to its current name Diocese of São Tomé and Príncipe.

Churches
The cathedral is Sé Catedral de Nossa Senhora da Graça (Cathedral of Our Lady of Grace) in São Tomé.

Bishops
The bishops of the Diocese of (São) Tomé (and Príncipe):
 Bishops of Tomé (Roman rite) 
 Bishop Diogo Ortiz de Vilhegas (1533–1540)
 Bishop Bernardo da Cruz, O.P. (1540–1553)
 Bishop Gaspar Cão, O.S.A. (1554–1572)
 Bishop Martinho de Ulhoa, O. Cist. (1578–1592)
 Bishop Francisco de Vilanova, O.F.M. (1592–1602)
 Bishop António Valente, O.P. (1604–1608)
 Bishop Jerónimo de Quintanilha, O. Cist. (1611–1614)
 Bishop Pedro de São Agostinho Figueira de Cunha Lobo, O.S.A. (1615–1620)
 Bishop Francisco de Soveral, O.S.A. (1623.06.10 – 1627.02.08)
 Bishop Domingos da Assunção, O.P. (1627–1632)
 Bishop Manoel a Nativitate do Nascimento, O.S.H. (1674–1677)
 Bishop Bernardo de Santa Maria Zuzarte de Andrade, C.R.S.A. (1677–1680)
 Bishop Sebastião de São Paulo, O.F.M. (1687–1690)
 Bishop Timóteo do Sacramento, O.S.P.P.E. (1693.01.02 – 1696.12.17)
 Bishop António da Penha de França, O.A.D. (1699–1702)
 Bishop João de Sahagún, O.A.D. (1709–1730)
 Bishop Leandro de Santo Agostinho da Piedade, O.A.D. (1739–1740)
 Bishop Tomas Luiz da Conceição, O.A.D. (1742–1744)
 Bishop Ludovico das Chagas, O.S.A. (1745–1747)
 Bishop António Nogueira (bishop) (1753–1758)
 Bishop Vicente do Espirito Santo, O.A.D. (1779.03.01 – 1782.12.17)
 Bishop Domingo Rosario, O.P. (1782–1788)
 Bishop Rafael de Castello de Vide, O.F.M. (1794–1800)
 Bishop Caetano Veloso, O.F.M. (1802.05.24 – 1803.09)
 Bishop Custodio d'Almeida, O.A.D. (1805.06.26 – 1812.03.23)
 Bishop Bartholomeu de Martyribus Maya, O.C.D. (1816.03.08 – 1819.11.10), appointed Prelate of Mozambico
 Bishops of São Tomé and Príncipe (Roman rite)
 Archbishop Moisés Alves de Pinho, C.S.Sp. (1941.01.18 – 1966.11.17); he is listed here as Archbishop because he is listed concurrently as Archbishop of Luanda, Angola.
 Bishop Abílio Rodas de Sousa Ribas, C.S.Sp. (1984.12.03 – 2006.12.01)
 Bishop Manuel António Mendes dos Santos, C.M.F. (2006.12.01 – 2022.07.13)

Ecclesiastical decoration
 Cross of São Tomé (Catholic ecclesiastical decoration)

References

Sao Tome
1534 establishments in the Portuguese Empire
Religious organizations established in the 1530s
Sao Tome And Principe